Gey is a surname. Notable people with this surname include:

George Otto Gey, American scientist
Jesse Gey, American field hockey player 
Konstantin Gey, Soviet revolutionary and politician
Leonhard Gey, German painter and art professor 
Matthias Gey, German fencer
Steven Gey, Florida State University law professor

See also
 Gēy, an endonym for Harar, Ethiopia, East Africa
 Gey-Gel State Reserve, a nature reserve in Azerbaijan
 Gay (disambiguation)